École Française de Banjul is a French international school in Bakau, The Gambia, in the Banjul metropolitan area. It serves levels preschool through première; classes use the National Centre for Distance Education (CNED) beginning in sixième. It was established in 1984.

See also

 Education in the Gambia
 List of international schools
 List of schools in the Gambia

References

External links
 , the school's official website

Educational institutions established in 1984
Elementary and primary schools in the Gambia
International high schools
International schools in the Gambia
French international schools in Africa
Bakau
High schools and secondary schools in the Gambia